Lloyd Cleveland "Muscle" Sholes Jr. (October 3, 1916 – February 23, 1999) was an American baseball player who was sometimes called "the Babe Ruth of the minor leagues."

Professional baseball career

Minor leagues
Shoals made his professional debut in 1937 in the Pennsylvania State League for the St. Louis Cardinals organization. A muscular 220-pounder, Shoals quickly established himself as a formidable slugger, earning him the nickname "Muscle Shoals" after the northern Alabama town by that name. In 1939, playing for Johnson City in the Appalachian League, he hit .365, with 16 home runs. Two years later, he hit 26 home runs in the Cotton States League.

In 1946 and 1947, Shoals played for Kingsport of the Appalachian League, where he batted .333 and .387. His only full year in the Carolina League was in 1949, and he hit 55 home runs for the Reidsville Luckies, still a league record and not seriously challenged since Tolia "Tony" Solaita's 49 homers in 1968. Shoals also led the league in runs batted in and missed the batting title and Triple Crown by only two percentage points. The highlight of his season was a three home run, 15 total-base game against Greensboro on June 12. In his last at-bat, Shoals lined a single off the wall, only inches from his fourth homer. No Carolina League player has ever hit four home runs in a game.

Late in the season, the St. Louis Browns offered to bring Shoals up to the majors. He declined for several reasons, including his wife's pregnancy and effectively having to take a pay cut, as he was the beneficiary of so many passed hats, $20 handshakes, and merchant discounts that he couldn't afford to leave.

The Cincinnati Reds drafted Shoals and signed him to a minor league contract in 1950; he was sent to Columbia, South Carolina, of the South Atlantic League. Shoals subsequently disappeared for several games on the road trip to Jacksonville, Florida. When he finally showed up, he was released. Reidsville signed him for the remainder of the season, but he batted only .224 in 116 at-bats. Shoals finished his career back in Kingsport. When he retired after the 1955 season, his career minor league stats included a .337 batting average, 362 home runs, and 1,529 runs batted in.

Post-professional baseball
After retirement from professional baseball Shoals worked for the Olin Mathieson Chemical Company, serving as a player-manager (mainly pinch-hitting) for a semi-pro club in Saltville called the Alkalies.

Legacy

In 2004, the Washington County Park Authority and the Washington County Department of Recreation dedicated a park in his memory.

References
Selections from a 1994 book written by Jim L. Sumner
 Shoals, Muscle with Stone, George., "Muscle: A Minor League Legend"., Infinity Publishing., Haverford, Pennsylvania., 2003

External links
Separating The Men From The Boys
Article by Tom Hufford
Minor league statistics

1916 births
1999 deaths
Minor league baseball players
Minor league baseball managers
People from Webster County, West Virginia
People from Abingdon, Virginia
Baseball players from West Virginia
Baseball players from Virginia